The F60 (or N60 as it is known in the U.S.) is a 35mm film SLR camera which was sold by Nikon between 1998 and 2001. It replaced the F50 and was aimed at the lower end of the amateur autofocus SLR market.

The F60 features autofocus, two forms of TTL light metering and various "programs" (ranging from manual operation to a highly automated point and shoot mode).

It was replaced by the similarly-priced F65 (also known as the N65) in 2001.

History

The F60 was introduced in late 1998 as the successor to the F50. It was targeted at the consumer market and at the time of release was Nikon's lowest-priced SLR on sale in the UK. It was noted by some reviewers that the F60's wheel-based interface was easier to use than the pushbutton interface of the F50.

A variant known as the F60D or N60D, which added a date/time-imprinting facility was also available.

Design

The F60 body was made from polycarbonate and metal, and available in both "champagne silver" and black. It features compatibility with most older Nikkor F-mount lenses, except AFS and pre-AI lenses. However, in some cases autofocus and/or TTL metering is not supported.

Features of the F60 include the 'T' Time setting - where a first press of the shutter release opens the shutter, and a second closes it, and AF servo tracking in 'Sport' mode. The camera also supports five different flash modes, including 'slow' for low light scenes. The film speed is only automatically adjustable by DX encoding.

Notable omissions include depth-of-field preview and any form of remote shutter release. Both these features were included in the F65.

The body was used as the basis of Fuji's popular Fuji S1 Pro digital SLR of 2001, with modifications to add a colour LCD, a digital storage compartment, and a separate battery compartment for the digital portion. The S1 removed the 'T' setting but added a physical remote shutter release screw.

References

External links

F060
F060